Līna Mūze (born 4 December 1992) is a Latvian track and field athlete who competes in the javelin throw. On 2 June 2011, she set a Latvian junior record of 60.64 m. Her personal best is 64.87 m, set in 2019.

Career
At the 2010 World Junior Championships in Athletics in Moncton, Canada she won the silver medal.

At the 2016 European Athletics Championships Mūze had no mark after injuring herself during the first attempt in the qualification.

Achievements

References 

 

1992 births
Living people
People from Smiltene
Latvian female javelin throwers
Athletes (track and field) at the 2012 Summer Olympics
Athletes (track and field) at the 2020 Summer Olympics
Olympic athletes of Latvia
Universiade medalists in athletics (track and field)
Universiade silver medalists for Latvia
Medalists at the 2015 Summer Universiade